The following is a list of the MTV Movie Award winners and nominees for Best Dance Sequence. It was first introduced in 1995. This award was last given out in 2004.

References

MTV Movie & TV Awards